Andrew Durutalo (born October 25, 1987) is a Fijian-raised American-born professional rugby player who plays for the Seattle Seawolves of Major League Rugby (MLR). He has been capped by the U.S. national sevens team and the United States national rugby union team.

Early life
Durutalo was born in New York but soon moved back to Fiji where he attended Suva Grammar School. 
He graduated with a degree in Business administration from Hakuoh University in Japan.

Club career
After a successful spell with the USA sevens program, Durutalo signed with the Sunwolves for the 2016 Super Rugby season.

On 16 May 2017, Durutalo signs for English Championship club Ealing Trailfinders based in London ahead of the 2017-18 season. scoring five tries in his first six appearances attracted attention from the English Premiership. He moved up to the English Premiership, on 16 October 2017, signing with Worcester Warriors.

On 16 April 2018, Durutalo will return to Ealing Trailfinders back in the RFU Championship on a long-term deal from the 2018-19 season.

In 2021 he was awarded "Man of the Match" in the 139th Varsity Match. In April 2022 he scored a try for Oxford University in their 21–17 victory over Cambridge in the 140th Varsity Match while appearing alongside fellow American internationals, Eric Fry and Nick Civetta. 

After playing eight matches for the Seattle Seawolves in 2021 MLR season, he re-signed with the Seawolves for the 2022 season.

International career
He played at the 2006 Under 19 Rugby World Championship. He also represented Fiji's Under 20s team.

Duratalo was first capped by the United States in 2012 against Canada. Durutalo played for the U.S. at the 2015 Rugby World Cup in England.

Durutalo also played for the U.S. national sevens team at the 2016 Summer Olympics, where the U.S. finished in ninth place, missing the quarterfinal round.

References

External links 
 Andrew Durutalo at USA Rugby
 

1987 births
Living people
American rugby union players
United States international rugby union players
Dual-code rugby internationals
United States international rugby sevens players
Sportspeople from New York City
Sunwolves players
American expatriate sportspeople in Japan
Olympic rugby sevens players of the United States
Rugby sevens players at the 2016 Summer Olympics
Rugby union flankers
Rugby union number eights
Ealing Trailfinders Rugby Club players
Worcester Warriors players
Seattle Seawolves players
Oxford University RFC players